Yuka Sakurai (櫻井由香 Sakurai Yuka, born September 2, 1974) is a Japanese volleyball player who plays for Denso Airybees.

Clubs
Yorojoshi Shogyo High School → Denso Airybees (1993-)

National team
 1998-2002,2005,2007-

Awards

Individual
2005 11th V.League Best Libero award

Team
2008 2007-08 Japan Volleyball League/V.League/V.Premier -  Runner-up, with Denso.
2008 57th Kurowashiki All Japan Volleyball Championship -  Champion, with Denso.
2010 Empress's Cup -  Champion, with Denso.

National team
2008: 5th place in the Olympic Games of Beijing

References

External links
FIVB Biography
Denso Official Website Profile

1974 births
Living people
Volleyball players at the 2008 Summer Olympics
Japanese women's volleyball players
Olympic volleyball players of Japan